(noun) and  (adjective) are two Old Norse terms of insult, denoting effeminacy or other unmanly behaviour.

Ergi in the Viking Age
To accuse another man of being  was called scolding (see ) and thus a legal reason to challenge the accuser in holmgang. If the accused fought successfully in holmgang and had thus proven that he was not , the scolding was considered what was in Old English called , an unjustified, severe defamation, and the accuser had to pay the offended party full compensation. The Gray Goose Laws states:

There are no written records of how the northern people thought of homosexuality before this conversion. The sociologist David F. Greenberg points out:

Saleby Runestone

Modern usage

In modern Scandinavian languages, the lexical root  has assumed the meaning "angry", as in Swedish,  Bokmål and Nynorsk , or Danish . Modern Icelandic has the derivation , meaning "to seem/appear irritable", similar to Bokmål ergre, meaning "to irritate". In modern Faroese the adjective  means "angry/annoyed" and the verb  means to "taunt" or "bully". In modern Dutch, the word  has become a fortifier equivalent to English very; the same is true for the old-fashioned adjective  in German, which means "wicked" (especially in compounds as  "malicious" and  "unsuspecting"), but has become a fortifier in the Austrian German. The meaning of the word in Old Norse has been preserved in loans into neighboring Finnic languages: Estonian  and Finnish , both meaning "cowardly".

See also

  (Ancient Greek)

References

External links
  SAOB: Arg.adj
  Från niding till sprätt. En studie i det svenska omanlighetsbegreppets historia från vikingatid till sent 1700-tal
  Adolfsson, Lars: Germanska mannaförbund. Existens och initiation. Bachelor's thesis, Uppsala 2004
 Viking Answer Lady

Effeminacy
Male gender nonconformity
Pejorative terms for men
Gender-related stereotypes
Old Norse